is a Japanese street photographer and educator who lives and works in Osaka. As of autumn 2014, he has produced six books of photographs of people in cities, including Citizens: 1979–1983, which won the Society of Photography Award. He was the official photographer of the butoh dance group Byakko-sha from 1982 to 1994.

Life and work
Abe was born in Osaka. He studied photography at Ōsaka Shashin Senmon Gakkō (now Visual Arts Osaka).

From 1982 to 1994 he was the official photographer for Byakko-sha, a butoh dance group based in Kyoto. In this capacity he travelled extensively in 1982 and 1983.

From 2002 Abe has taught at the Visual Arts Osaka college. He has been a member of the Osaka-based photography collective running Vacuum Press since 2006. Since 2013 he has been represented by Hatten Gallery.

Books
 = Kurīchāzu: Kami no kemono-tachi = Creaturers. Village, 1989. . Black and white photographs; essay by Isamu Ōsuka and artist chronology in Japanese.
 = Ōsaka. Osaka: Vacuum, 2007. . Vacuum Press 1. Colour photographs.
 = Citizens: 1979–1983. Osaka: Vacuum, 2009. . Vacuum Press 4. Black and white photographs; no captions or other text.
 = Kokubyaku nōto: 1996–1999 = Black & white note: 1996–1999. Osaka: Vacuum, 2010. . Vacuum Press 5. Black and white photographs; no captions or other text.
 = Manira: August, 1983 = Manila: August, 1983. Osaka: Vacuum, 2011. . Vacuum Press 7. Black and white photographs; no captions or other text.
 = Kokubyaku nōto: 2 = Black & white note 2. Osaka: Vacuum, 2012.  . Vacuum Press 9. Black and white photographs; no captions or other text.
2001. Osaka: Vacuum, 2013. . Vacuum Press 11. Black and white photographs; no captions or other text.
Busan. Osaka: Vacuum, 2014. Black and white photographs.
 = 1981 (jō) = 1981: Top. Osaka: Vacuum, 2015. Vacuum Press 14. First volume of a two-volume set. Black and white photographs.
 = 1981 (ge) = 1981: Bottom. Osaka: Vacuum, 2015. Vacuum Press 15. Second volume of a two-volume set. Black and white photographs.
 = 1981 Kōbe = 1981: Kobe. Osaka: Vacuum, 2016.
New York. Osaka: Vacuum, 2017.
Citizens in Society 1989~1994. Osaka: Vacuum, 2019.

Solo exhibitions
2006: Black & White Note: Box, Gallery 10:06, Osaka.
2012: Citizens/1983, Gallery Niépce, Tokyo.
2012/2013: Citizens, The Third Gallery Aya, Osaka.
2013: Black & White Note, Black & White Note 2, Place M Photo Gallery, Tokyo. Related to his Society of Photography Award.

Group exhibitions
2011: Citizens, Quad Gallery, Format International Photography Festival, Derby, UK, 4 March–8 May 2011.
2013: Paris Photo, Grand Paris, Paris. Presented by The Third Gallery Aya, Osaka.
2013: Citizens, The Third Gallery Aya, Osaka. With Miyako Ishiuchi. Part of the exhibition Paris Photo 2013.
2014: FotoIstanbul, Istanbul, Turkey, 17 October – 18 November 2014.

Awards
2013: Society of Photography Award (Shashin no Kai shō) from the Society of Photography.

Notes

References

1955 births
Living people
Japanese photographers
People from Osaka
Street photographers
20th-century photographers
21st-century photographers